S. M. Salahuddin Islam is a major general of the Bangladesh Army and Military Secretary to the President of Bangladesh. Prior to that, he was Executive Chairman of the Bangladesh Export Processing Zone Authority.

Career
Islam was commissioned in the infantry corp in 1987. He served in the 21st Battalion of the East Bengal Regiment. He had also commanded units of Rapid Action Battalion, President Guard Regiment, and Special Security Force. He was deployed in the United Nation peacekeeping operations in Congo (DRC).

On 10 March 2019, he was appointed Chairman of the Bangladesh Export Processing Zone Authority. He is a director of Hotels International Limited, the holding company of Pan Pacific Sonargaon.

References

Living people
Bangladesh Army generals
Year of birth missing (living people)